The Isle of Man League 2007–08 (known as the Sure Mobile Premier League for sponsorship reasons) was the ninety-ninth such league competition on the Isle of Man.

Football in the Isle of Man is played at an amateur level. There are two tiers of men's football, consisting of 27 clubs. There are six senior cup competitions – the Manx FA Cup, Railway Cup, Hospital Cup, Woods Cup, Paul Henry Gold Cup and the Charity Shield. Each club has a reserve team in the Isle of Man Football Combination, and the Junior Cup for the reserve teams. There is also the Cowell Cup an annual Under-19 tournament.

There is one tier of women's football. The Isle of Man national football team is not affiliated with UEFA or FIFA.

Men

League tables
St Georges were crowned champions in the Premier League, the top tier of Manx amateur football. The league was renamed from Division One in 2007. Union Mills triumphing in and being promoted from Division Two. Braddan F.C. were also promoted from Division Two, whilst St Johns United and Douglas Royal were relegated from the Premier League. Division Two was known as the CFS Division Two for sponsorship reasons.

Premier League
Saint Georges F.C. won their tenth league title, second consecutive title, and fourth in five years.

Division Two
Colby F.C., from the south of the Isle, completed an unbeaten season.

Cups

FA Cup
Peel 0–5 St Georges
St Georges completed the domestic treble with this victory, but missed out on the Railway Cup and chance for a quadruple.

Railway Cup
Peel 4–3 St Georges
The Railway Cup provided some consolation to Peel after finishing runners-up in the Premier League and FA Cup.

Charity Shield

Hospital Cup
Corinthians 0–2 St Georges

Woods Cup
Braddan 0–2 Colby

Paul Henry Gold Cup
Castletown Metropolitan 0–3 Michael United

Junior Cup
Peel 2–0 Rushen United

Cowell Cup (U19)
St Georges 2–3 St Marys

Women

League table

References

External links
Isle of Man league tables and cup results at FA, Full-time service

Isle of Man Football League seasons
Man
Foot
Foot